Miss USA 1971 was the 20th Miss USA pageant, televised live by CBS hosted by Bob Barker from the Jackie Gleason Auditorium in Miami Beach, Florida on May 22, 1971.

The pageant was won by Michele McDonald of Pennsylvania, who was crowned by outgoing titleholder Deborah Shelton of Virginia.  McDonald was the first – and to date only – woman from Pennsylvania to win the Miss USA title, and went on to place as a semi-finalist at Miss Universe 1971. 

For the 1971 pageant, the number of semi-finalists called was reduced from 15 to 12.  It would remain at this number until 1984, when it was cut again to 10.

Results 
{| class="wikitable sortable" style="font-size: 95%;"
|-
!Final Results
!Contestant
|-
|Miss USA 1971
|
  Pennsylvania – Michele McDonald †
|-
|1st Runner-Up|
  Texas – Brenda Box
|-
|2nd Runner-Up|
  Arizona – Susanne Pottenger
|-
|3rd Runner-Up|
  Missouri – Nancy Rich
|-
|4th Runner-Up|
  Kentucky –Patricia Barnstable
|-
|Top 12|
  California – Karin Morrell  
   District of Columbia – Suzanne Pluskoski
  Florida – Susan Deaton
  Maryland – Carol Theis
  Michigan – Pat Glannan
  Vermont – Sandra Taft
  Virginia – Brenda Miller
|}
† Indicates contestant Is deceased 
Special awards

 Historical significance 
 Pennsylvania wins competition for the first time and surpasses its previous highest placement in 1967. Also becoming in the 17th state who does it for the first time.
 Texas earns the 1st runner-up position for the third time. The last time it placed this was in 1964.
 Arizona earns the 2nd runner-up position for the first time.
 Missouri earns the 3rd runner-up position for the first time.
 Kentucky earns the 4th runner-up position for the second time. The last time it placed this was in 1964.
 States that placed in semifinals the previous year were California, District of Columbia, Florida, Texas and Virginia.
 California placed for the fifteenth consecutive year.
 Virginia placed for the fifth consecutive year. 
 Florida and Texas placed for the third consecutive year. 
 District of Columbia made its second consecutive placement.
 Arizona and Vermont last placed in 1969.
 Maryland and Michigan last placed in 1968.
 Missouri and Pennsylvania last placed in 1967.
 Kentucky last placed in 1965.
 South Carolina breaks an ongoing streak of placements since 1969.
 New York and Washington break an ongoing streak of placements since 1968.
 Nevada breaks an ongoing streak of placements since 1967.

Delegates
The Miss USA 1971 delegates were:

 Alabama - Renee Smith
 Alaska - Katherine Hartman
 Arizona - Susanne Pottenger
 Arkansas - Paula Keith
 California - Karin Morrell
 Colorado - Diane Knaub
 Connecticut - Diane Turetsky
 Delaware - Nanette Crist
 District of Columbia - Suzanne Pluskoski
 Florida - Susan Deaton
 Georgia - Jenny Andrews
 Hawaii - Deborah Gibson
 Idaho - Kristeen Riordan
 Illinois - Paulette Breen
 Indiana - Deborah Downhour
 Iowa - Cindy Helmers
 Kansas - Nancy Bishop
 Kentucky - Patricia Barnstable
 Louisiana - Diane Risenstein
 Maine - Ruth McCleery
 Maryland - Carol Theis
 Massachusetts - April Dow
 Michigan - Pat Glannan
 Minnesota - Shirley Kittleson
 Mississippi - Janey Gillis
 Missouri - Nancy Rich
 Montana - Rebecca Thomas
 Nebraska - Lola Butler
 Nevada - Anita Laurie
 New Hampshire - Jane Laroche
 New Jersey - Brenda White
 New Mexico - Debbie Clary
 New York - Barbara Lopez
 North Carolina - Mary Rudroff
 North Dakota - Joanne Engel
 Ohio - Karen Haus
 Oklahoma - Kim Hardesty
 Oregon - Connie Oost
 Pennsylvania - Michele McDonald Rhode Island - Laurie Stahle
 South Carolina - Eunice Campbell
 South Dakota - Sonia Hart
 Tennessee - Sue Collins
 Texas - Brenda Box
 Utah - Janet Montgomery
 Vermont - Sandra Taft
 Virginia - Brenda Miller
 Washington - Christine McComb
 West Virginia - Peggy Tennant
 Wisconsin - Pamela Martin
 Wyoming''' - Kay Heaton

Judges 
 Willis Reed
 Willa Meda
 Burt Bacharach, Sr.
 Richard J. Knight
 Jane Kean
 Ben Novak
 Bobbi Johnson
 George Lindsey
 Hy Gardner
 Cindy Adams

External links 
 Miss USA official website

1971
1971 in Florida
1971 beauty pageants
Events in Miami Beach, Florida
May 1971 events in the United States